Thomas N. Graham (September 16, 1837 - February 4, 1911) was a Union Army soldier in the American Civil War who received the U.S. military's highest decoration, the Medal of Honor.

Graham was born on September 16, 1837, and entered service at Westville, Indiana. He was awarded the Medal of Honor, for extraordinary heroism shown on November 25, 1863, while serving as a Second Lieutenant with Company G, 15th Indiana Infantry Regiment, at the Battle of Missionary Ridge. His Medal of Honor was issued on February 15, 1897.

He died at the age of 73, on February 4, 1911, and was buried at the Oak Hill Cemetery in Lawrence, Kansas.

Medal of Honor citation

References

Further reading

1837 births
1911 deaths
Burials in Kansas
People of Indiana in the American Civil War
Union Army officers
United States Army Medal of Honor recipients
American Civil War recipients of the Medal of Honor